The following lists events that happened during 2008 in the Kingdom of Belgium.

Incumbents
Monarch: Albert II
Prime Minister:
 until 20 March: Guy Verhofstadt
 20 March-30 December: Yves Leterme
 starting 30 December: Herman Van Rompuy

Events

March
 March 2 - Bruno Valkeniers is chosen as party chairman of political party Vlaams Belang with 94.6% of the vote.
 March 20 - Leterme I Government sworn in after 9 months of negotiations.

April
 April 12 - Standard Liège beat Anderlecht 2–0 at home and win the First Division.

May
 May 8 - Club Brugge player François Sterchele dies in a car crash.

September
 September 22 - Political parties CD&V and N-VA end their collaboration. Geert Bourgeois resigns from the Flemish government.

October
 October 5 - Rik Ceulemans is the first Belgian to win the Marathon of Brussels in 2:19.29.

December
 December 22 - Albert II accepts Yves Leterme's resignation as Prime Minister
 December 28 - During a Taizé Community meeting in Brussels, 40,000 youths from across Europe come together to profess their faith.
 December 30 - Van Rompuy Government sworn in

Births
 April 16 – Princess Eléonore of Belgium, second daughter and fourth child of King Philippe of Belgium and Queen Mathilde of Belgium.

Deaths
 27 March – Robert Demoulin (born 1911), historian
 25 August – Paul Schruers (born 1929), bishop of Hasselt

See also
2008 in Belgian television

References

 
2000s in Belgium
Years of the 21st century in Belgium
Belgium
Belgium